HMS Tonnant was an 80-gun ship of the line of the Royal Navy. The British captured her in August 1793 during the Siege of Toulon but the French recaptured her when the siege was broken in December. Rear-Admiral Horatio Nelson captured her at Aboukir Bay off the coast of Egypt at the Battle of the Nile on 1 August 1798. She was taken into British service as HMS Tonnant. She went on to fight at the Battle of Trafalgar in 1805, during the Napoleonic Wars.

Tonnant became the flagship of Vice-Admiral Sir Alexander Cochrane when he assumed command of the North American Station in March of 1814 during the War of 1812 with the United States. On 7 September 1814 Francis Scott Key and John Stuart Skinner dined aboard the ship while seeking the release of a captured civilian prisoner, several days before the Battle of Baltimore. Key went on to write what later became the words to the American national anthem, "The Star-Spangled Banner" after watching the British attack on Baltimore's Fort McHenry. Tonnant was broken up in 1821.

French service

Tonnant was the lead ship in a class of 80-gun two-deckers built to a design by Jacques-Noël Sané, and ordered on 19 October 1787. She was laid down at the Toulon Dockyard in November 1787 and launched on 24 October 1789. Anglo-Spanish forces captured her there in August 1793, but left her when they withdrew in December. She then reverted to the French Navy.

Tonnant fought in the battles of Genoa on 14 March 1795 and The Nile on 1 August 1798 under Aristide Aubert Du Petit Thouars. During the battle, she severely damaged , causing nearly two hundred casualties, including 50 killed and 143 wounded. Among the dead was Majestics captain, George Blagdon Westcott. Du Petit-Thouars, who had both legs and an arm shot off, commanded his ship until he died. Tonnant was the only French ship still engaged in the morning, with her colours flying, though aground. It was not until 3 August that she finally struck her colours.

The British took her into their service, registering and naming her as HMS Tonnant on 9 December 1798. She arrived at the naval base at Plymouth, England on 17 July 1799. Even before she formally entered British service, she was among the vessels that participated in the capture of the Greek vessel Ardito on 24 October 1798.

Tonnant was commissioned under Captain Loftus Bland in January 1799, with Captain Robert Lewis Fitzgerald taking over in February. He sailed her to Gibraltar and then back to Britain. Upon her arrival in Plymouth in 1800 she was laid up in ordinary.

British service

Napoleonic Wars
Tonnant underwent repairs between December 1801 and April 1803. She was commissioned in March 1803 under Captain Sir Edward Pellew. Under his command she participated in the Blockade of Ferrol.

On 24 May the cutter Resolution captured Esperance and Vigilant, with Tonnant sharing in the capture. Next, Tonnant,  and  captured the Dutch ships Coffee Baum and Maasluys on 2 and 4 June.

Tonnant was part of Rear-Admiral Sir Robert Calder's squadron off Cape Ortegal when she encountered the French ships Duguay-Trouin and Guerrière on 2 September 1803. The two French Navy warships had broken out of the blockade when they met Tonnant. They escaped her but British naval forces of varying strengths harried them during their journey back to port and they only just made it to the safety of A Coruña.

Tonnant shared in the capture of Perseverance on 28 October, though the prize money was much less. Then on 29 November,  destroyed Bayonnoise; Tonnant was among the vessels sharing, by agreement, in the bounty money. In the new year, on 18 February 1804, Tonnant and the ships of the squadron recaptured the brig Eliza.

Later in 1804 Tonnant was in the Channel under Captain William Henry Jervis. Jervis had just arrived from Rochefort and was anxious to impart his intelligence to the commander-in-chief. Captain Charles Tyler replaced Jervis in March.

[[File:Nicholas Pocock - In action at Trafalgar, H.M.S. Tonnant accepting Monarca's surrender.jpg|thumb|Tonnant accepting ''Monarcas surrender, painted by Nicholas Pocock]]
During the Battle of Trafalgar (21 October 1805) she captured the 74-gun . Tonnant lost 26 officers and men killed and 50 officers and men wounded in the battle, with Tyler being among the wounded.

Tonnant underwent a refit at Portsmouth between January and June 1806. She was recommissioned in May under Captain Thomas Browne. She then served as flagship for Rear-Admiral Eliab Harvey. While under his command  distinguished herself in a number of small cutting out expeditions.

In July 1807 she was under Captain Richard Hancock and served as flagship for Rear-Admiral Michael de Courcy. In 1809 she was under the command of Captain James Bowen when she recaptured Ann of Leith on 8 April. Tonnant then was among the vessels sharing in the captures of Goede Hoop on 9 July and Carl Ludwig on 2 August.

Between November and December 1809 she was under repair at Plymouth. In 1810 she served under Captain Sir John Gore. Lloyd's List reported on 14 June 1811 that French privateer Adolphe had captured George and Mary, but that Tonnant had recaptured George and Mary, which had been sailing from the West Indies and which arrived in Plymouth on 11 June.

On 24 March 1812, still under the command of Gore, Tonnant was off Ushant when she captured the French privateer Emilie. Emilie was armed with twelve 10-pounder guns and had a crew of 84 men. She was nine days out of Saint-Malo and had captured one vessel, a Spanish merchant ship that the Royal Navy had recaptured on the 24th. Then on 18 April Tonnant captured Martha. On 12 May,  captured Betsy. Tonnant then again underwent repair between August and December 1812, this time at Chatham.

War of 1812
Tonnant joined the War of 1812 late. She was fitted for sea in the first quarter of 1814, being recommissioned in January under Captain Alexander Skene. Tonnant served as the flagship for Vice Admiral Sir Alexander Cochrane during the final months of the campaign in Chesapeake Bay. From her he directed attacks on Washington, D.C., Baltimore and then the final Battle of New Orleans from the Gulf of Mexico. From March 1814 she was under the command of Captain John Wainwright. In October 1814 Captain Charles Kerr assumed command.

"Star-Spangled Banner"
It was aboard Tonnant near the mouth of the Potomac River, on 7 September 1814 that the Americans, Colonel John Stuart Skinner and Francis Scott Key, dined with Vice Admiral Cochrane, Major General Robert Ross, Rear Admiral Sir George Cockburn and Rear Admiral Edward Codrington. They were pleading for the release of a civilian prisoner, Dr. William Beanes. After his release, Skinner, Key and Beanes were then transferred to the frigate HMS Surprise and later allowed to return to their own truce vessel sloop, but were not allowed to return to Baltimore because they had become familiar with the strength and position of British units and knew of the British intention to attack Baltimore. As a result, Key witnessed the bombarding of Fort McHenry (September 13 and 14) and was inspired to write a poem called Defence of Fort M'Henry, later named "The Star-Spangled Banner". During the bombardment, HMS  provided the "rockets red glare" whilst HMS Meteor (along with four other bomb vessels) provided the "bombs bursting in air" that feature in the lyrics.Skinner, John Stuart “Incidents of the War of 1812” From The Baltimore Patriot. Reprinted: Maryland Historical Magazine, Baltimore. Volume 32, 1937. (pp 340-347)  https://archive.org/details/marylandhistoric3219mary/page/340/mode/2up

The body of Major General Ross
After Major General Robert Ross's death in the Battle of North Point, his body was stored in a barrel of 129 gallons (586 L) of  Jamaican rum aboard Tonnant. When she was diverted to New Orleans for the forthcoming battle (see above), the body was later shipped on the British ship  to Halifax, Nova Scotia where his body was interred on 29 September 1814 in the Old Burying Ground.

New Orleans
Tonnant continued to serve Cochrane as a flagship when he directed the British naval forces at the Battle of New Orleans. Immediately before the battle, ship's boats from Tonnant participated in the British victory at the Battle of Lake Borgne.

Between 12 and 15 December 1814, Captain Lockyer of Sophie led a flotilla of 42 boats, barges, launches and 3 unarmed gigs to attack the US gunboats.  Lockyer drew his flotilla from the fleet that was massing against New Orleans, including the 74-gun third rates  and Tonnant, and a number of other vessels including  Armide, Seahorse,  and Meteor.

Lockyer deployed the boats in three divisions, of which he led one. Captain Montresor  of the gun-brig Manly commanded the second, and Captain Roberts of Meteor commanded the third. After rowing for 36 hours, the British met the Americans at St. Joseph's Island. On 13 December 1814, the British attacked the one-gun schooner . On the morning of 14 December, the British engaged the Americans in a short, violent battle. One longboat from Tonnant, commanded by Lieutenant James Barnwell Tattnall grappled the largest gunboat and was sunk, its boarding party transferred to the other ships' boats.

The British captured the American flotilla, comprising the tender, and five gunboats. The British lost 17 men killed and 77 wounded; Tonnant had three men killed and 15 wounded, one of whom died later.  then evacuated the wounded. In 1821 the survivors of the flotilla shared in the distribution of head-money arising from the capture of the American gunboats and sundry bales of cotton. In 1847 the Admiralty issued a clasp (or bar) marked "14 Dec. Boat Service 1814" to survivors of the boat service who claimed the clasp to the Naval General Service Medal.

Tonnant was off New Orleans in January 1815, and in the vicinity of the attack on Fort Bowyer in February 1814.

Post-war and fate
Tonnant returned to England in May 1815. She then served as the flagship for Admiral Lord Keith when she took part in the exiling of Napoleon to St. Helena in 1815, though she was not part of the flotilla that took him there.

Captain John Tailour assumed command in November. From 1816 to 1817 she was the Flagship of Rear-Admiral Sir Benjamin Hallowell on the Cork station.

Tonnant was paid off into ordinary in November 1818. She was broken up at Plymouth in March 1821.

See also
 List of ships captured in the 18th century
 Glossary of nautical terms (A-L)
 Glossary of nautical terms (M-Z)

 Notes, citations, and references NotesCitationsReferences'''

External links 
 
Instructions for the exercise of the great guns on board H.M.S. Tonnant, 1817-1821 (approximate) MS 28 held by Special Collections & Archives, Nimitz Library at the United States Naval Academy

Ships of the line of the Royal Navy
Ships of the line of the French Navy
Tonnant-class ships of the line
Ships built in France
1789 ships
Captured ships
Napoleonic-era ships
War of 1812 ships of the United Kingdom
Maritime incidents in 1798
The Star-Spangled Banner